The Dallara IR-00, and its evolutions, the Dallara IR-01 and Dallara IR-02, are open-wheel formula racing cars, designed, developed, and produced by Italian manufacturer Dallara for use in the IndyCar one-make spec-series, between 2000 and 2002.

References

External links
Dallara's Official Website

IndyCar Series
Open wheel racing cars
IR-00
American Championship racing cars